Miss India Worldwide 2007 was the 16th edition of the international beauty pageant. The final was held in Fords, New Jersey, United States on  April 8, 2007. About 19 countries were represented in the pageant. Fareisa Joemmanbaks  of Suriname was crowned as the winner at the end of the event.

Results

Special awards

Delegates
 – Kiara Podesta
 – Sapna Sehravat
 – Priya Singh
 – Sunita Vaz
 – Annushka Prabhudyal
 – Movina Nagarajan
 – Sonya Bugwandeen-Reilly
 – Racquel Baghaloo
 – Reneetha Veeraya
 – Sabrina Bou Ali
 – Celina Kalfane
 – Gaganpreet Kaur
 – Jaishree Manuferan
 – Nadia Vorajee
 – Fareisa Joemmanbaks
 – Anushka Nirupa Dube
 – Ashita Ghote
 – Snehali Naik
 – Ayushka Singh-Gharib

References

External links
http://www.worldwidepageants.com/

2007 beauty pageants